Pope Pius V (17 January 1504 – 1 May 1572), born Antonio Ghislieri (from 1518 called Michele Ghislieri, O.P.), was head of the Catholic Church and ruler of the Papal States from 8 January 1566 to his death in May 1572. He is venerated as a saint of the Catholic Church. He is chiefly notable for his role in the Council of Trent, the Counter-Reformation, and the standardization of the Roman Rite within the Latin Church. Pius V declared Thomas Aquinas a Doctor of the Church.

As a cardinal, Ghislieri gained a reputation for putting orthodoxy before personalities, prosecuting eight French bishops for heresy. He also stood firm against nepotism, rebuking his predecessor Pope Pius IV to his face when he wanted to make a 13-year-old member of his family a cardinal and subsidize a nephew from the papal treasury.

By means of the papal bull of 1570, Regnans in Excelsis, Pius V excommunicated Elizabeth I of England for heresy and persecution of English Catholics during her reign. He also arranged the formation of the Holy League, an alliance of Catholic states to combat the advancement of the Ottoman Empire in Eastern Europe. Although outnumbered, the Holy League famously defeated the Ottomans at the Battle of Lepanto in 1571. Pius V attributed the victory to the intercession of the Blessed Virgin Mary and instituted the feast of Our Lady of Victory. Biographers report that as the Battle of Lepanto ended, Pius rose and went over to a window, where he stood gazing toward the East.  "...[L]ooking at the sky, he cried out, 'A truce to business; our great task at present is to thank God for the victory which He has just given the Christian army'."

Biography

Early life

Antonio Ghislieri was born 17 January 1504 in Bosco in the Duchy of Milan (now Bosco Marengo in the province of Alessandria, Piedmont), Italy. At the age of fourteen he entered the Dominican Order, taking the name Michele, passing from the monastery of Voghera to that of Vigevano, and thence to Bologna. Ordained a priest at Genoa in 1528, he was sent by his order to Pavia, where he lectured for sixteen years. At Parma he advanced thirty propositions in support of the papacy and against Protestantism.

He became master of novices and was on several occasions elected prior of more than one Dominican priory. During a time of great moral laxity, he insisted on discipline, and strove to develop the practice of the monastic virtues. He fasted, did penance, passed long hours of the night in meditation and prayer, traveled on foot without a cloak in deep silence, or only speaking to his companions of the things of God. As his reformist zeal provoked resentment, he was compelled to return to Rome in 1550, where, after having been employed in several inquisitorial missions, he was appointed to the commissariat of the Holy Office.

In 1556 he was made Bishop of Sutri by Pope Paul IV and was selected as inquisitor of the faith in Milan and Lombardy. In 1557 he was made a cardinal and named inquisitor general for all Christendom. His defense of Bartolomé Carranza, Archbishop of Toledo, who had been suspected of heresy by the Spanish Inquisition, earned him a reprimand from the pope.

Under Pope Pius IV (1559–65) he became Bishop of Mondovì in Piedmont. Frequently called to Rome, he displayed his unflinching zeal in all the questions on which he was consulted. Thus he offered opposition to Pius IV when the latter wished to make Ferdinand de' Medici, then only thirteen years old, a Cardinal. His opposition to the pontiff led to his dismissal from the palace and limits being placed on his authority as inquisitor.

Papal election

Before Michele Ghislieri could return to his diocese, Pope Pius IV died. On 4 January, a courier from Spain arrived, prompting rumors that King Philip II favoured the election of Cardinal Ghislieri. This in turn gave additional momentum to the efforts of Charles Cardinal Borromeo and his allies, who already supported the candidacy of  Ghislieri. As the cardinals conferred with each other more intensely, the number of those who looked to Ghislieri increased, and this led eventually to his election as the new pope on the afternoon of 8 January 1566. Ghislieri took the regnal name Pope Pius V. He was crowned ten days later, on his 62nd birthday by the protodeacon.

Six weeks after the conclave, Cardinal Borromeo wrote to Henry I, Cardinal-King of Portugal recalling the election. He spoke of the new pope, and of his "high esteem for him on account of his singular holiness and zeal", seeing these qualities as a sign that he would make a good pope "to the great satisfaction of all".

Pontificate

His pontificate saw him dealing with internal reform of the Church, the spread of Protestant doctrines in the West, and Turkish armies advancing from the East.

Church discipline
Aware of the necessity of restoring discipline and morality at Rome to ensure success without, he at once proceeded to reduce the cost of the papal court after the manner of the Dominican Order to which he belonged, compel residence among the clergy, regulated inns, and assert the importance of the ceremonial in general and the liturgy of the Mass in particular.

In his wider policy, which was characterised throughout by an effective stringency, the maintenance and increase of the efficacy of the Inquisition and the enforcement of the canons and decrees of the Council of Trent had precedence over other considerations.

Liturgy
Accordingly, in order to implement a decision of that council, he standardised the Holy Bible by promulgating the 1570 edition of the Roman Missal. Pius V made this Missal mandatory throughout the Latin rite of the Catholic Church, except where a Mass liturgy dating from before 1370 AD was in use. This form of the Mass remained essentially unchanged for 400 years until Pope Paul VI's revision of the Roman Missal in 1969–70, after which it has become widely known as the Tridentine Mass; use of the last pre-1969 edition of the Missal, that by Pope John XXIII in 1962, was permitted without limitation for private celebration of the Mass and in July 2007, was allowed also for public use, as laid down in the motu proprio Summorum Pontificum of Pope Benedict XVI. However, in July 2021, Pope Francis issued a new motu proprio, Traditionis Custodes, which abrogated Summorum Pontificum and reinstated the restrictions on the celebration of 1962 Missal.

Thomism
Pius V, who had declared Thomas Aquinas the fifth Latin Doctor of the Church in 1567, commissioned the first edition of Aquinas' opera omnia, often called the editio Piana in honor of the Pope. This work was produced in 1570 at the studium generale of the Dominican Order at Santa Maria sopra Minerva, which would be transformed into the College of Saint Thomas in 1577, and again into the Pontifical University of Saint Thomas Aquinas, Angelicum in the 20th century.

Holy League
Pius V arranged the forming of the Holy League against the Ottoman Empire, as the result of which the Battle of Lepanto (7 October 1571) was won by the combined fleet under Don John of Austria. It is attested in his canonisation that he miraculously knew when the battle was over, himself being in Rome at the time. Pius V also helped financially in the construction of Valletta, Malta's capital city, by sending his military engineer Francesco Laparelli to design the fortification walls (A bronze bust of Pius V was installed at the Gate of Valletta in 1892.). To commemorate the victory, he instituted the Feast of Our Lady of Victory.

The Protestant Revolt
By the time Pius V ascended the throne, Protestantism had swept over all of England and Scotland, as well as half of Germany, the Netherlands, and parts of France; only Spain, Ireland, Portugal and Italy remained unswervingly Catholic. Pius V was thus determined to prevent its insurgency into Italy—which he believed would come via the Alps and Milan.

Huguenots
Pius V recognized attacks on papal supremacy in the Catholic Church and was desirous of limiting their advancement. In France, where his influence was stronger, he took several measures to oppose the Protestant Huguenots. He directed the dismissal of Cardinal Odet de Coligny and seven bishops, nullified the royal edict tolerating the extramural services of the Reformers, introduced the Roman catechism, restored papal discipline, and strenuously opposed all compromise with the Huguenot nobility.

Elizabeth I
His response to the Queen Elizabeth I of England assuming position of the Supreme Governor of the Church of England included support of the imprisoned Mary, Queen of Scots and her supporters in their attempts to take over England "ex turpissima muliebris libidinis servitute" "from a most sordid slavery to a woman's voracity". A brief English Catholic uprising, the Rising of the North, had just failed. Pius then issued a Papal bull, Regnans in Excelsis ("Reigning on High"), dated 27 April 1570, that declared Elizabeth I a heretic and released her subjects from their allegiance to her. It was the official decree of excommunication on her and it also declared an ipso facto excommunication on anyone who did not deny allegiance to her. In response, Elizabeth  now actively started persecuting them for treason.

Character and policy

As a young man, Michele Ghislieri was eager to join the inquisition. Under Paul IV he rose to inquisitor general, and from there ascended to the papacy. 

Upon election to the papacy as Pius V, Ghislieri immediately started to get rid of many of the extravagant luxuries then prevalent in the court. One of his first acts was to dismiss the papal court jester, and no subsequent pope had one. He forbade horse racing in St. Peter's Square. Severe sanctions were imposed against blasphemy, adultery, and sodomy. These laws quickly made Pius V the subject of Roman hatred; he was accused of trying to turn the city into a vast monastery. He was not a hypocrite: in day-to-day life Pius V was highly ascetic. He wore a hair shirt beneath the simple habit of a Dominican friar and was often seen in bare feet.

It is said that in "the time of a great famine in Rome, he imported grain at his own expense from Sicily and France [...]; a considerable part of which he distributed among the poor, gratis, and sold the rest to the public below cost."

Papal bulls
Katherine Rinne writes in Waters of Rome that Pius V ordered the construction of public works to improve the water supply and sewer system of the city—a welcome step, particularly in low-lying areas, where typhoid and malaria were inevitable summer visitors.

In 1567, he issued Super prohibitione agitationis Taurorum & Ferarum prohibiting bull-fighting.

Besides In Coena Domini (1568), there are several others of note, including his prohibition of quaestuary (February 1567 and January 1570); condemnation of Michael Baius, the heretical Professor of Leuven (1567); reform of the Roman Breviary (July 1568); formal condemnation of homosexual behaviour by the clergy (August 1568); the banishment of the Jews from all ecclesiastical dominions except Rome and Ancona (1569); an injunction against use of the reformed missal (July 1570); the confirmation of the privileges of the Society of Crusaders for the protection of the Inquisition (October 1570); the suppression of the Fratres Humiliati (February 1571); the approbation of the new office of the Blessed Virgin (March 1571); and the enforcement of the daily recitation of the Canonical Hours (September 1571).

Papal garments
Pius V is often credited with the origin of the Pope's white garments, supposedly because after his election Pius continued to wear his white Dominican habit. However, many of his predecessors also wore white with a red mozzetta, as can be seen on many paintings where neither they nor Pius is wearing a cassock, but thin, wide, white garments.

An article by Agostino Paravicini Bagliani in L'Osservatore Romano of 31 August 2013 states that the earliest document that speaks explicitly of the Pope wearing white is the Ordo XIII, a book of ceremonies compiled in about 1274 under Pope Gregory X. From that date onward, the books of ceremonies speak ever more explicitly of the Pope as wearing a red mantle, mozzetta, camauro and shoes, and a white cassock and stockings.

Canonizations
Pius V canonized one saint during his reign: Ivo of Chartres on 18 December 1570.

Consistories

Pius V created 21 cardinals in three consistories including Felice Piergentile who would become Pope Sixtus V.

Death and canonization

Pius V died on 1 May 1572. Pius V suffered from bladder stones, a condition for which he was unwilling to have an operation. Additionally, Pius V fasted and served extensively in his last years, leading to "great weakness". After his death, three stones were discovered in his bladder. He was buried in the chapel of S. Andrea which was close to the tomb of Pope Pius III, in the Vatican. Although his will requested he be buried in Bosco, Pope Sixtus V built a monument in the chapel of SS. Sacramento in the Liberian basilica. His remains were transferred there on 9 January 1588.

In 1696, the process of Pius V's canonisation was started through the efforts of the Master of the Order of Preachers, Antonin Cloche. He also immediately commissioned a representative tomb from the sculptor Pierre Le Gros the Younger to be erected in the Sistine Chapel of the Basilica di Santa Maria Maggiore. The pope's body was placed in it in 1698. Pope Pius V was beatified by Pope Clement X in the year 1672, and was later canonized by Pope Clement XI (1700–21) on 22 May 1712.

In the following year, 1713, his feast day was inserted in the General Roman Calendar, for celebration on 5 May, with the rank of "Double", the equivalent of "Third-Class Feast" in the General Roman Calendar of 1960, and of its present rank of "Memorial". In 1969 the celebration was moved to 30 April, the day before the anniversary of his death (1 May).

Cardinal John Henry Newman declared that "St. Pius V was stern and severe, as far as a heart burning and melted with divine love could be so ... Yet such energy and vigour as his were necessary for the times.  He was a soldier of Christ in a time of insurrection and rebellion, when in a spiritual sense, martial law was proclaimed."

The front of his tomb has a lid of gilded bronze which shows a likeness of the dead pope. Most of the time this is left open to allow the veneration of the saint's relics.

See also
Cardinals created by Pius V
List of popes
List of Catholic saints
Pope Saint Pius V, patron saint archive

References

Further reading
St Pius V, by Robin Anderson, TAN Books and Publishers, Inc, 1973/78.

External links

 
1504 births
1572 deaths
16th-century Christian saints
16th-century Italian Roman Catholic bishops
16th-century popes
Bishops of Mondovì
Bishops of Sutri
Counter-Reformation
Dominican popes
Dominican saints
Inquisitors
Italian Dominicans
Italian popes
Italian Roman Catholic saints
Members of the Holy Office
Papal saints
People from Bosco Marengo
Tridentine Mass
Popes
Canonizations by Pope Clement XI
Beatifications by Pope Clement X
Burials at Santa Maria Maggiore